Diaphus holti, the Small lanternfish, is a species of lanternfish found in the Atlantic and Indian Oceans. This species grows to a length of  SL.

Etymology
The fish is named in honor of Irish ichthyologist Ernest William Lyons Holt (1864-1922), being the first person who had ever identified a postlarva of the genus Myctophus.

References 

 

Myctophidae
Taxa named by Åge Vedel Tåning
Fish described in 1918